Thomas Fraser of Lovat and Kinnell, 4th Laird of Lovat (died c. 1455), was a Scottish lord, and the Chief of Clan Fraser of Lovat.

Fraser was the son of Hugh Fraser of Lovat and Kinnell, 3rd Laird of Lovat, and Lady Janet Fenton. He flourished in the 1440s and 1450s. He married Lady Janet Dunbar. His eldest son Hugh became the first Lord Lovat, i.e. the first Laird of Lovat to be elevated to the Peerage of Scotland.

Clan Fraser
Clan Fraser Chiefs
1450s deaths
Year of birth unknown
Year of death uncertain